In enzymology, an aspartate N-acetyltransferase is an enzyme that catalyzes the chemical reaction

acetyl-CoA + L-aspartate  CoA + N-acetyl-L-aspartate

Thus, the two substrates of this enzyme are acetyl-CoA and L-aspartate, whereas its two products are CoA and N-acetyl-L-aspartate.

This enzyme belongs to the family of transferases, specifically those acyltransferases transferring groups other than aminoacyl groups.  The systematic name of this enzyme class is acetyl-CoA:L-aspartate N-acetyltransferase. Other names in common use include aspartate acetyltransferase, and L-aspartate N-acetyltransferase.

References 

 
 

EC 2.3.1
Enzymes of unknown structure